Sigrid Madeline Thornton  (born 12 February 1959) is an Australian film and television actress. Her television work includes Prisoner (1979–80), All the Rivers Run (1983), SeaChange (1998–2019) and Wentworth (2016–2018). She also starred in the American Western series Paradise (1988–91). Her film appearances include Snapshot (1979), The Man from Snowy River (1982), Street Hero (1984) and Face to Face (2011). She won the AACTA Award for Best Guest or Supporting Actress in a Television Drama for the 2015 miniseries Peter Allen: Not the Boy Next Door.

Biography

Early years
Thornton was born in Canberra, the daughter of Merle, an academic and writer, and Neil Thornton, an academic. She was raised in Brisbane, attending St. Peter's Lutheran College. For two years, she lived in London, where she was a member of the Unicorn Theatre.

Back in Brisbane she attended Twelfth Night Theatre Junior Workshop and in 1970, during the Captain Cook Bicentenary Celebrations, Thornton appeared before Queen Elizabeth II as Rosa Campbell-Praed in Looking Glass on Yesterday. Thornton was a student of noted theatre director, Joan Whalley.

Career
She acted in TV series Homicide in 1973 and Division 4 in 1975. She also appeared on The Sullivans, as Elizabeth "Buffy" Turnbull.

In 1977, Thornton made her film debut as Wendy in The FJ Holden directed by Michael Thornhill, and in the same year as Maria in the film adaptation of Henry Handel Richardson's colonial Australian novel, The Getting of Wisdom (1977) directed by Bruce Beresford. In 1978, Thornton appeared in the Australian television sequel of the British comedy series Father, Dear Father in Australia and Cop Shop,. The same year she played Angela in the film Snapshot (aka The Day After Halloween) directed by Simon Wincer, for which role she was nominated for Australian Film Awards Best Actress in a Feature Film in 1979.

In 1980,  she appeared as Roslyn Coulson in the Australian television drama Prisoner (known overseas as Prisoner: Cell Block H). Thornton starred in 1981 in Duet for Four. In 1982, she took on the roles of Jessica Harrison in the films The Man from Snowy River and its sequel in 1988 The Man from Snowy River II. In 1983, she marked an appearance in Street Hero. She starred in 1983's miniseries All the Rivers Run. 1986 saw her in The Lighthorsemen, the TV adaptation of Nevil Shute's novel The Far Country, Great Expectations: The Untold Story and Slate, Wyn & Me.

From 1988 to 1991, she appeared as Amelia Lawson in the American television drama series Paradise. Syndication of All the Rivers Run and The Man from Snowy River and The Man from Snowy River II brought her to a wider international audience.

In 1991, she starred in Over the Hill directed by George T. Miller and in 1996, Love in Ambush directed by Carl Shultz. She starred as Laura Joy Gibson in the Australian television series SeaChange from 1998 to 2000, winning the Most Outstanding Actress award in 1999 and 2000.

Stage highlights
Thornton's stage performances include a 2002/03 touring production of The Blue Room directed by Simon Phillips for the Melbourne Theatre Company opposite Marcus Graham. In 2009 she made her debut with Opera Australia in its production at Melbourne's Arts Centre as Desiree Armfeldt in Sondheim and Wheeler's A Little Night Music, directed by Stuart Maunder.

In 2014, she won critical acclaim for her portrayal of Blanche DuBois in Tennessee Williams' play A Streetcar Named Desire for the Black Swan State Theatre Company in Perth.

In 2015, she appeared in the premiere of Stephen Beckett's play Diary of a Nobody, inspired by the 1892 novel The Diary of a Nobody, at the Princess Theatre, Launceston, Tasmania. The same year, Thornton played the part of Golde in Fiddler on the Roof at the Princess Theatre, Melbourne.

As of September 2022 Sigrid made her stage debut for The Sydney Theatre Company in the premiere stage play The Lifespan of a Fact to rave reviews and in 2023 returns to the stage for Anton Checkov's The Seagull for The Sydney Theatre Company.

Recent film and television work
In 2002, Thornton starred in Australian thriller The Pact, directed by Strathford Hamilton, written by Hugh O'Brien.

In 2003, Thornton appeared in Mittens directed by Emma Freeman. In 2004, she played a geneticist in a four-episode arc on MDA. She shaved her head for her role in the 2005 telemovie Little Oberon.

Thornton hosted the Nine Network's What's Good For You.

In 2010, she appeared in Underbelly: The Golden Mile as recurring character Geraldine "Gerry" Lloyd, an Australian Federal Police detective and investigator for the Wood Royal Commission.

In 2011, Thornton starred in Face to Face, an independent Australian film directed by Michael Rymer.

In 2012, she participated in Who Do You Think You Are.

In 2016, Thornton appeared in the fourth season of SoHo drama series Wentworth for seven episodes as a special guest star. She portrayed the character of Sonia Stevens (initially played by Tina Bursill in Prisoner), a woman on remand for the suspected murder of her best friend.

Thornton returned for season 5 of Wentworth as a main cast member and served as the main antagonist in season 6, until her characters death in episode 7, "The Edge".

In 2018, she appeared in Anh's Brush with Fame.

In 2021 Thornton would film the feature film Slant and critics praised Thornton's role as 'career best'.

The "Sigrid Factor"
In his book The Big Shift, about changing Australian demographics and culture, Bernard Salt coined the term the "Sigrid factor" pointing out that Australian towns in which movies had been made featuring Thornton had prospered since that time. More broadly he referred to changing Australian cultural values which were well reflected in the types of places in which Sigrid Thornton had acted: the Riverland during the 1980s All the Rivers Run and the coast in the 2000s SeaChange.

Personal life and advocacy
Thornton is married to actor Tom Burstall and has two children. She is known for her work with World Vision, the Royal Children's Hospital, Vision Australia, Reach Foundation and other charitable causes. She has lobbied successive governments to keep libraries open and to resource the Australian film and television industry. She has been appointed to several federal and state film bodies, including Film Victoria and is involved in helping to sustain and develop the industry.

Filmography
FILM

TELEVISION

Awards and nominations

In 2019, Thornton won the Chauvel Award, which acknowledges significant contribution to the Australian screen industry.

References
Notes

Sources

Further reading

External links

Sigrid Thornton on Instagram

1959 births
20th-century Australian actresses
21st-century Australian actresses
Actresses from Brisbane
Actresses from Canberra
Australian film actresses
Australian soap opera actresses
Australian stage actresses
Officers of the Order of Australia
Living people
Logie Award winners